William Adolph Danenhauer Jr. (born December 1, 1963) is an American retired professional wrestler, college football coach, and college athletics administrator. He is best known for his appearances with World Championship Wrestling from 1993 to 1996 under the ring name Dave Sullivan, where he played the dyslexic brother of Kevin Sullivan. Danenhauer served as the head football coach at Dana College in Blair, Nebraska from 2003 to 2009, compiling a record of 22–55.

Early life and football career
Dannenhauer attended Westside High School, where both he and his brother wrestled. He and his brother attended the University of Nebraska Omaha, where they played football for the Omaha Mavericks. Dannenhauer went on to play in the short-lived United States Football League (USFL) before ending his playing career. He went on to serve as an assistant coach for the Mavericks before joining Washburn University as offensive coordinator for the Washburn Ichabods.

Professional wrestling career

Early career (1989–1993)
In 1989, Dannehauer decided to become a wrestler after meeting Harley Race at a high school tournament. He trained under Len Denton and debuted later that year. Danenhauer started wrestling in the National Wrestling Alliance territory Pacific Northwest Wrestling under the ring name "The Equalizer". He teamed with The Grappler as "The Wrecking Crew", with the duo winning the NWA Pacific Northwest Tag Team Championship on two occasions.

In 1990, he would tour on and off with Catch Wrestling Association for two years under the name "The Barbarian".

In 1991, he briefly wrestled in New Japan Pro-Wrestling, most notably losing a match to Scott Norton on March 21 at the Tokyo Dome.

In 1992, Danenhauer left PNW for the Global Wrestling Federation where he wrestled as "Captain Ron". Worked in Puerto Rico for the World Wrestling Council. He would tour the United Kingdom under the name "American Hawkwind."

World Championship Wrestling (1993–1996)
In 1993, Danenhauer joined World Championship Wrestling as The Equalizer, and teamed briefly with Rick Rude as his tag team partner/bodyguard. They feuded with Dustin Rhodes and Road Warrior Hawk. He also teamed with Paul Orndorff.

His biggest push started in the summer of 1994 when he became "Dave Sullivan" the dyslexic brother of Kevin Sullivan who regularly mispronounced his own forename as "Evad". He was being picked on by The Nasty Boys and brought Kevin in to help him against them. He was injured by them, so Kevin Sullivan brought in Cactus Jack to help them out. After Kevin and Jack took care of The Nasty Boys, they split up, and Jack left. Hulk Hogan made his WCW debut that summer, and Sullivan became his biggest fan. Kevin hated Hogan, and problems started brewing.

Sullivan started teaming with Hogan and Sting against Ric Flair and his henchmen, and Kevin soon turned on Dave, which started a feud that went into 1995. After his feud with Kevin ended, Dave fell in love with Kimberly, the valet of Diamond Dallas Page. Page took offense to this and started a feud with Dave that lasted all summer. During this feud, Dave gave Kimberly presents, which infuriated Page even more, and at point won an arm wrestling contest at the 1995 Great American Bash which resulted in him going on a date with Kimberly. Sullivan eventually lost the feud and moved on.

Sullivan's next feud was with Big Bubba Rogers. Sullivan had a pet rabbit that he brought to ringside with him, and Bubba was allergic to rabbits. Bubba started wearing a surgical mask to keep from inhaling the allergens, but Sullivan would always pull it off and get the victory. Danenhauer left WCW in early 1996 after participating in the second World War 3 event.

Retirement and football coaching career
Danenhauer retired from professional wrestling in 2001 due to the cumulative impact of injuries sustained in his football and wrestling careers. He relocated to Bentonville, Arkansas, where he worked for Wal-Mart as a fitness trainer. In 2001, he began working as offensive coordinator for the Vikings football team of Dana College in Blair, Nebraska. He was appointed head football coach in 2003 and later athletic director.

Championships and accomplishments
Empire Wrestling Association
EWA North American Championship (1 time)
NWA Pacific Northwest Wrestling
NWA Pacific Northwest Tag Team Champion (2 times) – with The Grappler
Professional Wrestling Federation
PWF Eastern States Championship (1 time)
PWF Tag Team Championship (2 times) – with Baby Huey (1) and George South (1)
Southern States Wrestling
SSW Heavyweight Championship (1 time)
United States Wrestling Federation
USWF Tag Team Championship (1 time) – with John Bradshaw
Wrestling Observer Newsletter
Worst Gimmick (1994)
Worst Wrestler (1993, 1994)

Head coaching record

References

External links
 
 

1960 births
Living people
American male professional wrestlers
Dana Vikings athletic directors
Dana Vikings football coaches
Dyslexia in fiction
Nebraska–Omaha Mavericks football players
Professional wrestlers from Nebraska
Sportspeople from Omaha, Nebraska
Washburn Ichabods football coaches
Washington Federals/Orlando Renegades players